Stirling University Boat Club is one of the sports clubs who are part of University of Stirling, in the city of Stirling, Scotland.

Originally started in 1987 it has been going continuously ever since.

SUBC is affiliated to Scottish Rowing, the National Governing Body for rowing in Scotland.

In December 2013, the university played host to the competition BUCS Indoors, an indoor ergometer event, at the Gannochy Sports Hall.

Training 
Training sessions on the water take place at Stirling Rowing Club located near the centre of Stirling, on a stretch of the River Forth.
Land training sessions take place at the University of Stirling, Scotland's University for Sporting Excellence. The club makes use of the high class weights rooms for Strength and Conditioning.

Tayforth Boat Race 
The Tayforth Boat Race is the annual university boat race between the University of Stirling and the University of Dundee. The race features competing coxed fours (4+) and/or mixed eights (8+) on a 2 km stretch of the River Forth.

See also 
Scottish Rowing
University rowing (UK)

References

External links 
 Stirling University Sport Union: Rowing

1987 establishments in Scotland
Sports clubs established in 1987
Sport in Stirling (council area)
University and college rowing clubs in Scotland
University of Stirling